Despina Vandi Live is the first live album and seventh album overall by Greek singer Despina Vandi. It was released in 2003 by Heaven Music and it went platinum. It includes recordings from her sold-out live concert in Lycabettus theatre in Athens.

Track listing

Release history

Charts

Credits and personnel

Personnel
Christina Argiri - background vocals
Vasilis Diamantis - clarinet
Akis Diximos - second vocals
Giorgos Florakis - background vocals
Nektarios Georgiadis - background vocals
Antonis Gounaris - guitars (acoustic, twelve-strings, classic, electric)
Nikos Halkousis - remix
Rolland Hoffman - flamengo guitar
Tony Kontaxakis - conducting, guitars (electric, acoustic)
Giannis Koutsouflakis - remix
Trifon Koutsourelis - keys
Giannis Mpithikotsis - bouzouki, baglama, tzoura
Alex Panayi - background vocals
Andreas Papadopoulos - keys
Phoebus - music, lyrics, keyboards, background vocals, programming, orchestration
Kostas Platakis - bouzouki
Manolis Platakis - guitars (electric)
Giorgos Roilos - percussion, timpani
Andreas Siderakis - drums
Nikos Stavropoulos - bouzouki
Vasilis Tassopoulos - percussion
Vasilis Theodorakoglou - keys
Petros Triantafillopoulos - bass
Despina Vandi - vocals
Martha Zioga - background vocals

Production
Antonis Gounaris - sound, computer editing, additional programming and orchestrations
Giannis Ioannidis - mastering
Trifon Koutsourelis - orchestration, programming
Lefteris Neromiliotis - mix
Giannis Nikolakopoulos - assistant sound engineering
Akis Pashalakis - assistant sound engineering
Panagiotis Petronikolos - sound, sound recording studio, mix
Phoebus - production management, orchestration
Vaggelis Siapatis - sound recording studio, computer editing
Giorgos Stampolis - production, computer editing
Fanis Tsirakis - computer editing
Christos Zorbas - technical officer recording

Design
Menelaos Mirillas - live photos
Konstantina Psomadaki - art direction

Credits adapted from the album's liner notes.

References

Despina Vandi albums
Greek-language albums
2003 live albums
Heaven Music live albums